The Pleasanton Fault is a seismically active geological structure in Alameda County and Contra Costa County, California, USA. The existence of the fault is disputed as geotechnical reports have found no evidence for its existence.

Relation to hydrological features
All the streams draining Livermore Valley merge above the Bernal Subbasin and then leave the subbasin and the valley as the Arroyo de la Laguna.  Groundwater occurs throughout the valley floor portion of the Bernal Subbasin under conditions ranging from unconfined to confined.  There is no inflow of groundwater across the Pleasanton Fault south of the City of Pleasanton.  This consequence arises because any movement of groundwater in the southern section is essentially parallel to the Pleasanton Fault.

See also
 Mocho Subbasin
 Tesla Fault

References

External links
 Bulletin of the Seismological Society of America; December 1971; v. 61; no. 6; p. 1795-1799; 1971 Seismological Society of America, NATIONAL CENTER FOR EARTHQUAKE RESEARCH U. S. GEOLOGICAL SURVEY, MENLO PARK, CALIFORNIA

Seismic faults of California
Geology of Alameda County, California
Geology of Contra Costa County, California
Livermore Valley
Geography of Pleasanton, California
Livermore, California
Geography of the San Francisco Bay Area